Abdullah al-Mehdar (?-2010) was an Al-Qaeda in the Arabian Peninsula (AQAP) member who was the leader of a cell in Yemen. On 13 January 2010 it was reported that he had been killed by Yemeni security forces. He had been fighting alongside Shia rebels in Saada before he was killed in a gunfight in the town of Sa'dah. The fighting was so intense that it partially destroyed his home. A few days after his death, two Yemeni soldiers were killed in what was believed to have been a reprisal for Mehdar's death.

References

Year of birth missing
2010 deaths
Terrorism in Yemen
Yemeni al-Qaeda members
Alleged al-Qaeda recruiters